Leni Stern (born 28 April 1952) is a German jazz guitarist and singer.

Early life 
Stern was born Magdalena Thora, in Germany on 28 April 1952. She was interested in music from an early age, beginning piano studies at the age of six and taking on the guitar a few years later. She was an actress in Germany, including appearing on television, then enrolled at the Berklee College of Music in 1977. She lived in Boston until 1980, then moved to New York.

Later life and career 
In 1983, she formed a band of her own with Paul Motian on drums and Bill Frisell on guitar. Vocals became a more important part of her music from the 1997 release of Black Guitar. She is married to guitarist Mike Stern.

Discography 

 Clairvoyant (Passport Jazz, 1986)
 The Next Day (Passport Jazz, 1987)
 Secrets (Enja, 1989)
 Closer to the Light (Enja, 1990)
 Ten Songs (Lipstick, 1992)
 Like One (Lipstick, 1993)
 Words (Lipstick, 1995)
 Black Guitar (1997)
 Kindness of Strangers (Leni Stern, 2000)
 Finally the Rain Has Come (Leni Stern, 2002)
 When Evening Falls (Leni Stern, 2004)
 Love Comes Quietly (Leni Stern, 2006)
 Africa (Leni Stern, 2007)
 Alu Mayé (Have You Heard) (Leni Stern, 2007)
 Sa Belle Belle Ba (Leni Stern, 2010)
 Sabani (Leni Stern, 2012)
 Smoke, No Fire (Leni Stern, 2012)
 Jellel (Leni Stern, 2013)
 Dakar Suite (Leni Stern, 2016)
 3 (Leni Stern, 2018)
 4 (Leni Stern, 2020)

Source:

References

External links 
 

German jazz guitarists
German jazz singers
German women singers
German women guitarists
Women jazz guitarists
1952 births
Living people
Musicians from Munich
Sedgwick family
Ngoni players